Andy Boulton (born 25 February 1973) is a Scottish professional darts player who plays in events of the Professional Darts Corporation (PDC). He is nicknamed X-Factor.

Career
Boulton made his televised debut in the PDC UK Open in 2005 starting at the preliminary round and reaching the third round, beating players such as Sergio Bongiovanni. He was drawn against rising star Colin Osborne and lost 5-1.

Boulton played in the 2006 Winmau World Masters, beating three previous opponents before defeating Tony O'Shea in the last 32 stage. He eventually lost to Martin Adams in the last 16. He then played at the 2008 BDO World Darts Championship, causing a big upset in the first round beating Martin Atkins before losing to Ted Hankey in the second round.

In March 2008 Boulton won the unranked North Lanarkshire Open beating Robert Thornton in the final.

Boulton qualified for the 2009 UK Open as a pub qualifier. Beating Darren Latham 6-5 in the first round he lost 6-4 to Wes Newton in the second round. Later that year he claimed the Granite City Open title in Aberdeen by beating former world champion John Walton in the final.

Boulton was a stand-by qualifier for the 2011 BDO World Championship and progressed to the first round as Martin Adams was already assured of a place at the Lakeside had won the Winmau World Masters. Boulton was defeated in the first round 3-0 by Robbie Green.

In 2011 Boulton won the Scotland National Championship and again qualified for the UK Open.

Boulton crossed over to the PDC in 2015 through the Q School Order of Merit with 20 points. He also qualified for the German Masters. 

The X Factor is currently sponsored by Showtime Darts who helped to design and manufacture his new signature darts.

Boulton won a two-year PDC Tour Card at UK Q-School in January 2019 via the Order of Merit.

Boulton switched his allegiance from England to Scotland on residency grounds after previously living in England for many years.

Private life
Boulton has three children – Lloyd, Ebony, and Bailey.

World Championship performances

BDO
2008: Second round (lost to Ted Hankey 1–4)
2011: First round (lost to Robbie Green 0–3)
2012: First round (lost to Scott Waites 1–3)

PDC
2016: First round (lost to Gary Anderson 0–3)
2020: First round (lost to Danny Baggish 2–3)
2021: Second round (lost to Stephen Bunting 2–3)

Performance timeline

PDC European Tour

References

External links
Andy Boulton's Website

1973 births
Living people
Professional Darts Corporation former tour card holders
Scottish darts players 
Sportspeople from Edinburgh
British Darts Organisation players